We're Not Happy 'til You're Not Happy is the fifth studio album by ska punk band Reel Big Fish. It was released on April 5, 2005 on Mojo Records to mixed reviews.

Background and production
In February 2004, the band finished pre-production for their next album. Following this, they embarked on a tour of Europe, which lasted in March. In May 2004, they planned recording their next album. In June and July 2004, the band went on a North American tour, with Catch 22, Rx Bandits, Lucky Boys Confusion, Big D and the Kids Table. Recording ultimately began in September 2004; around this time trumpeter Tyler Jones left the band. Jones' role was fulfilled by John Christianson, who worked with frontman Aaron Barrett in the Forces of Evil. Recording wrapped up in October 2004.

Music

Notably darker than the band's previous album, Cheer Up!, the album's songs commonly express jealousy, regret, short-lasting fame, and disappointment toward mainstream record companies.
The album also includes covers of Tracy Chapman's "Talkin' Bout a Revolution", Morrissey's "We Hate It When Our Friends Become Successful" and Social Distortion's "Story of My Life". Both the Chapman cover and the Social Distortion cover were respectively chosen as the first and second singles.

Release
In November 2004, Reel Big Fish went on a West Coast US tour; the members spent the Christmas period working on side projects. On February 2, 2005, We're Not Happy 'til You're Not Happy was announced for release in two months' time. They embarked on a co-headlining tour with Bowling for Soup. "The Fire" was posted on the band's Myspace profile on March 18, 2005 ahead of the album. We're Not Happy 'til You're Not Happy was released on April 5, 2005 through Jive Records. In June 2005, they toured Europe, and then went on a US tour with American Hi-Fi, Punchline and Zolof the Rock & Roll Destroyer between June and August 2005. American Hi-Fi dropped off the tour  and were replaced by Catch 22 from the July 17 date, as Barrett explains: "[American Hi-Fi] weren't being received very well by the ska kids, and because they were pretty burnt out from being on tour for a year and a half non-stop".

In late August 2005, they filmed a music video for "Don't Start a Band" with director Jonathan London. The following month, the band went on a month-long tour of the UK with the Matches, Skindred and My Awesome Compilation. They toured across New Zealand and Australia with Goldfinger and the Matches, leading up to a one-off show in Hawaii. On September 22, 2005, the "Don't Start a Band" video was posted online. While in New Zealand, trumpeter Scott Klopfenstein was hospitalized due to what the band referred to as "abnormal fatigue"; the rest of the band continued their scheduled performances. They went on a brief East Coast US tour with the Tossers and Transition. Reel Big Fish closed the year with a New Year's Eve show in Costa Mesa, California, with Klopfenstein back in the band.

Reel Big Fish opened 2006 with a co-headlining West Coast US tour with Goldfinger, dubbed the Deep Freeze Tour; they were supported by Zebrahead and Bottom Line. On January 13, 2006, the band announced they left Jive Records, with their manager Vince Pileggi explaining that the "traditional major label business model is a dinosaur whose feet are already covered in tar". A UK leg of the tour followed without Goldfinger, running into February 2006. Klopfenstein had to be flown home due to his previous illness flaring up as the rest of the band continued on a tour of mainland Europe. In March 2006, the band performed at The International Ska Circus festival. In July and August 2006, the band embarked on a headlining US tour, with support from MxPx, Streetlight Manifesto, Transition, and Whole Wheat Bread. In the midst of this, the band released the live album Our Live Album Is Better Than Your Live Album, which was recorded across several shows. Between October and December 2006, the band toured across the US with support from Streetlight Manifesto, Suburban Legends, and Westbound Train.

Reception

AllMusic described the album's songs as "angry" and "embittered", but also deemed the album as "super catchy".

Track listing

Personnel
Reel Big Fish
Aaron Barrett - Guitar, Synthesizer, Producer, Lead Vocals
Scott Klopfenstein - Trumpet, Guitar, Keyboards, Vocal Harmonies
Matt Wong - Bass guitar
Dan Regan - Trombone
John Christianson - Trumpet

Additional musicians
Justin Ferreira - drums

Production
Eddy Schreyer - Mastering
John Halpern - Photography
Chaz Harper - Mastering
Vince Pileggi - Management
Denise Trorman - Art Direction, Design
Beau Burchell - Engineer
Shawn Sullivan - Producer, Mixing, Engineer
Jesse Alvarado - Engineer
David Irish - Engineer, Mixing
Lars Stalfors - Assistant Engineer, Beats

References

External links

We're Not Happy 'til You're Not Happy at YouTube (streamed copy where licensed)

2005 albums
Reel Big Fish albums
Jive Records albums
Mojo Records albums